This is a list of libraries in 18th-century Massachusetts, North America. It includes subscription, rental, medical, church, and academic libraries. In general, it excludes book collections of private individuals.

Boston
 American Academy of Arts and Sciences (est. 1780)
 W.P. & L. Blake's Circulating Library, Boston
 Boston Library Society (est.1792)
 Christ Church
 Benjamin Guild's circulating library, Boston
 King's Chapel
 William Martin's Circulating Library, Boston
 Massachusetts Historical Library, Massachusetts Historical Society, Boston
 Massachusetts Medical Society
 John Mein's Circulating Library, Boston
 New England Library, collected by Thomas Prince
 William Pelham's circulating library
 Town Library, in the Town-House, King St.

Boylston, Massachusetts
 Social Library, Boylston Center (est.1792)

Bridgewater, Massachusetts
 Library in the East Precinct of Bridgewater

Cambridge, Massachusetts
 Harvard College Library

Concord, Massachusetts
 Charitable Library Society, Concord (est.1795)

Dorchester, Massachusetts
 Dorchester Library

Douglas, Massachusetts
 Douglas Social Library Association (est.1799)

Falmouth, Massachusetts
 First Congregational Church Library, Falmouth

Franklin, Massachusetts
 Franklin Library (est.1786)

Groton, Massachusetts
 Groton First Parish Library (est.1793)

Haverhill, Massachusetts
 Haverhill Library

Hingham, Massachusetts
 First Social Library, Hingham Centre (est.1771)

Lancaster, Massachusetts
 Lancaster Library (est.1790)

Leicester, Massachusetts
 Leicester Social Library Company (est.1793)

Leominster, Massachusetts
 Social Library, Leominster (est.1763)

Lincoln, Massachusetts
 Lincoln Social Library (est.1798)

Lunenburg, Massachusetts
 Lunenburg Social Library (est.1792)

Marlborough, Massachusetts
 Social Library, Marlborough

Medfield, Massachusetts
 Medfield Social Library (est.1786)

Middleton, Massachusetts
 Social library, Middleton (est.1772)

Newburyport, Massachusetts
 First Social Library, Newburyport
 Newburyport Book-Store circulating library
 Newburyport Library
 George Jerry Osborne's circulating library, "at his shop, Guttemberg's Head" Newburyport

Newton, Massachusetts
 Newton Library Society

Oxford, Massachusetts
 Social Library, Oxford

Pittsfield, Massachusetts
 Pittsfield Library Society

Rowe, Massachusetts
 Rowe Social Library (est.1797)

Royalston, Massachusetts
 Library Company of Royalston (est.1778)

Salem, Massachusetts
 William Carlton's circulating library, Salem
 John Dabney's circulating library, Salem
 Philosophical Library, Salem (est.1781)
 Social Library, Salem (est.1760)

Springfield, Massachusetts
 Springfield Library Company

Wareham, Massachusetts
 Wareham Social Library

Watertown, Massachusetts
 Union Library Society (est.1779)

Westford, Massachusetts
 Social library, Westford (est.1797)

Williamstown, Massachusetts
 Williams College Library

Worcester, Massachusetts
 Worcester Circulating Library Company
 Worcester District Medical Library (est.1798)

See also
 List of libraries in 19th-century Boston, Massachusetts
 List of public libraries in Massachusetts
 Books in the United States
 List of booksellers in Boston

References

External links
 Princeton University. Davies Project. American Libraries before 1876.

Libraries
Massachusetts
Libraries
Massachusetts
Libraries in Massachusetts
Massachusetts
Libraries, 18th century